The 2013 New Zealand gallantry awards were announced via a Special Honours List on 20 April 2013. Recipients are awarded New Zealand gallantry awards.

New Zealand Gallantry Decoration (NZGD)

 Lance Corporal Leon Kristopher Smith – New Zealand Special Air Service. Posthumous award.

New Zealand Gallantry Medal (NZGM)
Squadron Leader Benjamin Mark Pryor – Royal New Zealand Air Force.
Staff Sergeant Dean Maurice Rennie – Royal New Zealand Army Logistic Regiment.

References

New Zealand Royal Honours System
Gallantry awards
Hon
New Zealand gallantry awards